December 31 - Eastern Orthodox liturgical calendar - January 2

All fixed commemorations are observed by Orthodox Churches on 1 January of the Julian calendar ('Old Calendar'), which equates to January 14 on the New Style calendar.

For January 1 (New Style), Orthodox Churches on the Old Calendar commemorate the Saints listed on December 19.

Feasts
 Feast of the Circumcision of Christ.

Saints
 Martyr Theodotus, by the sword.
 Martyr Basil of Ancyra (362)  (see also: January 2)
 Saint Gregory of Nazianzus the Elder, bishop and father of Saint Gregory the Theologian (374)
 Saint Emilia, (mother of Sts. Macrina, Basil the Great, Naucratius, Peter of Sebaste, and Gregory of Nyssa) (375)
 Saint Basil the Great, Archbishop of Caesarea in Cappadocia (379)
 Saint Theodosius of Tryglia, abbot

Pre-Schism Western saints
 Hieromartyr Concordius of Spoleto (c. 175)
 Thirty soldier-martyrs in Rome, under Diocletian (c. 304)
 Saint Telemachus (Almachius), hermit who came to Rome from the East and publicly protested against Pagan rites on New Year's Day, killed by gladiators in the Roman amphitheatre (391 or 404)
 Saint Basil, Bishop of Aix en Provence (c. 475)
 Saint Eugendus, fourth Abbot of Condat Abbey in the Jura Mountains (510)
 Saint Fanchea of Killeany (Fanchea of Rossory), sister of St Enda of Aran (c. 520)
 Saint Fulgentius of Ruspe, Bishop of Ruspe in North Africa (533)
 Saint Justin of Chieti, bishop of Chieti, Italy (c. 540)
 Saint Felix of Bourges, Bishop of Bourges (c. 580)
 Saint Connat (Comnata, Comnatan), Abbess of Kildare Abbey in Ireland (c. 590)
 Saint Maelrhys, a saint on Bardsey Island in Wales (6th century)
 Saint Clarus, Abbot of St. Marcellus Monastery in Vienne, Gaul (c. 660)
 Saint Cúan (Mochua, Moncan), Irish abbot, founder of many churches and monasteries in Ireland, lived to nearly 100 (752)
 Saint Peter of Atroa, Abbot, opponent of iconoclasm (Peter the Standard-Bearer) (837) (see also: January 3 - East)
 Saint William of Dijon (William of Volpiano), Italian monastic reformer and architect (1031)

Post-Schism Orthodox saints
 New Martyr Peter of Tripolis in the Peloponnesus, at Temisi in Asia Minor (1776)
 Saint Athanasius (Volkhovsky), Bishop of Mohyliv, Wonderworker of Poltava (1801)

New martyrs and confessors
 New Hieromartyr Jeremiah Leonov (1918)
 New Hieromartyrs Platon (Kulbush), Bishop of Tallinn (Reval), Estonia, and with him protopresbyters Michael (Blaive) and Nicholas (Bezhanitsky) (1919)
 New Hieromartyrs Alexander (Trapitsyn), Archbishop of Samara;
 with him, priests: John (Smirnov), Alexander (Ivanov), Alexander (Organov), John (Suldin), Trophimus (Miachin), Viacheslav Infantov, Basil Vitevsky, and Jacob Alferov (1938)

Icon gallery

Notes

References

Sources 
 January 1/14. Orthodox Calendar (PRAVOSLAVIE.RU).
 January 14 / January 1. HOLY TRINITY RUSSIAN ORTHODOX CHURCH (A parish of the Patriarchate of Moscow).
 January 1. OCA - The Lives of the Saints.
 January 1. Latin Saints of the Orthodox Patriarchate of Rome.
 The Roman Martyrology. Transl. by the Archbishop of Baltimore. Last Edition, According to the Copy Printed at Rome in 1914. Revised Edition, with the Imprimatur of His Eminence Cardinal Gibbons. Baltimore: John Murphy Company, 1916. pp. 1–3.
 Rev. Richard Stanton. A Menology of England and Wales, or, Brief Memorials of the Ancient British and English Saints Arranged According to the Calendar, Together with the Martyrs of the 16th and 17th Centuries. London: Burns & Oates, 1892. p. 1.
Greek Sources
 Great Synaxaristes:  1 ΙΑΝΟΥΑΡΙΟΥ. ΜΕΓΑΣ ΣΥΝΑΞΑΡΙΣΤΗΣ.
  Συναξαριστής. 1 Ιανουαρίου. ECCLESIA.GR. (H ΕΚΚΛΗΣΙΑ ΤΗΣ ΕΛΛΑΔΟΣ). 
Russian Sources
  14 января (1 января). Православная Энциклопедия под редакцией Патриарха Московского и всея Руси Кирилла (электронная версия). (Orthodox Encyclopedia - Pravenc.ru).
  1 января (ст.ст.) 14 января 2013 (нов. ст.) . Русская Православная Церковь Отдел внешних церковных связей. (DECR).

January in the Eastern Orthodox calendar